Dabancheng District or Dawan Cheng, is one of 7 urban districts of the prefecture-level city of Ürümqi, the capital of Xinjiang Uygur Autonomous Region, Northwest China. According to the 2002 census, it has a population of 40,000.

The district seat of government is the town of the same name (Dabancheng Town). The name means 'Pass City'. Just south of the town is a low pass on the road from Urumchi southeast to Turfan. It crosses a mountain spur that connects the main Tien Shan with the Bogda Shan to the northeast. As of July 2015 GoogleEarth appears to show road and rail tunnels and viaducts being built to avoid the pass.

The water that is not used up for irrigation locally flows into the district's several small lakes (Yanhu, Xiao Yanhu and Chaiwopu Lake) or down the Baichang River into the Toksun County.
“It showed me the utter barrenness of the slopes of gravel and decayed rock over which the ascent is made from the Turfān depression to the watershed ; the remarkably low elevation of the latter, which on the plateau of Ta-fan-ch’êng [= Dawan Cheng] scarcely rises above 3,000 feet ; and the ease of communication secured by this route between the Turfān basin and Dzungaria. At the Chinese village of Ta-fan-ch’êng close to the watershed irrigation is still required for the fields, and a lively stream coming from the high Bogdo-ula mountains to the north-east serves this purpose. But on the low hills over which Urumchi is approached cultivation depends on rain and snowfall only. This marked change in climatic conditions made its effects strikingly felt when we reached Ta-fan-ch’êng from the south-east ; for there can be no doubt that the violent gales from the north-east for which the plateau is notorious, and one of which obliged us to make a day's halt there under rather trying conditions, are directly due to the ‘ aspiration ’ which draws the cold air of Dzungaria through this great gap of the T’ien-shan down into the deep depression of Turfān, where the atmosphere is warmed, even during the short winter, by far more abundant sunshine.”
Mountain ranges between Dabancheng and Ürümqi create a natural wind tunnel, increasing windspeed in the valley. Four of the five wind farms erected in Xinjiang in 2010 are in the area between National Highway 312 and the G30 Lianhuo Expressway, totaling more than 300 turbines.

Climate

References 

County-level divisions of Xinjiang
Ürümqi